The Renault Express is a panel van and leisure activity vehicle (LAV) manufactured and marketed by Renault since 2021. Based on the Dacia Dokker, it is sold alongside the Kangoo as a smaller and cheaper alternative.

History
Presenting the third generation of Renault Kangoo in November 2020, Renault also announced the expansion of its commercial vehicle range with a new, fourth model positioned as a smaller and cheaper alternative to the Kangoo Van. For this purpose, the Express name, which had not been used since 2002, was revived, and the Dacia marque was used since 2012. 

Renault has decided to end the production of the Dacia Dokker in its last form, including it in its offer in a thoroughly modernized form. The Express gained a new front apron resembling passenger models of the French company, with a centrally placed company logo and long, slender shaped headlights. A new cockpit design was also used, there was space for storage compartments with a total capacity of 48 liters, and an optional 8-inch Easy Link multimedia system screen was used. Moreover, the vehicle can be equipped with an inductive charger hidden in the armrest, 3 USB sockets, 4 12 V sockets, as well as a rear view camera and a blind spot monitoring system. Other parts of the body have undergone cosmetic changes; they are limited to remodeled rear lamp inserts, keeping the body, proportions, shapes of details and embossing from the Dacia Dokker.

Production

References

Express (2020)
Cars introduced in 2020
Vans